Birru is a surname. Notable people with the surname include:

Ayalew Birru (1892–1945), Ethiopian army commander and patriot
Dejazmach Birru, 19th-century Ethiopian warlord
Tadesse Birru (1921–1975), Ethiopian general 

Surnames of African origin